Jim Carlson (born February 17, 1947) is a Minnesota politician and member of the Minnesota Senate. A member of the Minnesota Democratic–Farmer–Labor Party (DFL), he represents District 52, which includes all but one precinct of Eagan and Mendota Heights, all of Mendota, and some of Burnsville in Dakota County in the southeastern Twin Cities metropolitan area.

Minnesota Senate
Carlson was first elected in 2006. He was unseated by Republican Ted Daley in 2010, but ran again and was elected in 2012. Carlson was reelected in 2016, 2020, and 2022.

References

External links 

Senator Jim Carlson official Minnesota Senate website
Senator Jim Carlson official campaign website
Follow the Money - Jim Carlson Campaign Contributions
2006

1947 births
Living people
Politicians from Saint Paul, Minnesota
People from Eagan, Minnesota
University of Minnesota alumni
Democratic Party Minnesota state senators
American Lutherans
21st-century American politicians